Bally Sports Kansas City (BSKC) is an American regional sports network owned by Diamond Sports Group, and operates as an affiliate of Bally Sports. The channel broadcasts coverage of professional, collegiate, and high school sports events both within and outside the Kansas City area. It maintains offices at Kauffman Stadium in Kansas City, Missouri.

Bally Sports Kansas City is available on cable providers throughout western and central Missouri, Kansas, eastern Nebraska, and Iowa; it is also available nationwide on satellite via DirecTV.

History

Originally operating as a subfeed of Fox Sports Rocky Mountain, then Fox Sports Midwest in 1998, the network formally announced that it would spin-off Fox Sports Kansas City as a separate channel on January 24, 2008, after Fox Sports Midwest signed an exclusive long-term broadcast agreement with the Kansas City Royals. The agreement was struck following the dissolution of the Royals Sports Television Network, a regional network formed in 2003 to broadcast games and analysis programs for the Major League Baseball franchise, which distributed its event telecasts to broadcast and cable affiliates throughout the Midwestern and South Central United States. Specifically, Fox Sports Kansas City was created to avoid scheduling conflicts with coverage of St. Louis Cardinals games televised by Fox Sports Midwest.

On December 14, 2017, as part of a merger between both companies, The Walt Disney Company announced plans to acquire all 22 regional Fox Sports networks from 21st Century Fox, including Fox Sports Kansas City. However, on June 27, 2018, the Justice Department ordered their divestment under antitrust grounds, citing Disney's ownership of ESPN. On May 3, 2019, Sinclair Broadcast Group and Entertainment Studios (through their joint venture, Diamond Holdings) bought Fox Sports Networks from The Walt Disney Company for $10.6 billion. The deal closed on August 22, 2019. On November 17, 2020, Sinclair announced an agreement with casino operator Bally's Corporation to serve as a new naming rights partner for the FSN channels. Sinclair announced the new Bally Sports branding for the channels on January 27, 2021.  On March 31, 2021, coinciding with the start of the 2021 Major League Baseball season, Fox Sports Kansas City rebranded as Bally Sports Kansas City, resulting in 18 other Regional Sports Networks renamed Bally Sports in their respective regions.

On March 14, 2023, Diamond Sports filed for Chapter 11 Bankruptcy.

Programming
Bally Sports Kansas City holds the exclusive regional cable television rights to the Kansas City Royals, and produces the Major League Baseball team's pre-game and post-game show Royals Live and the weekly magazine program Royals Insider. Starting with the 2017 season, the channel holds the exclusive regional television rights to Sporting Kansas City broadcasts.  Because there can be Royals and SKC programming at the same time, Bally Sports Kansas City is provided to cable operators as two separate channels, which normally carry identical programming.

During the college football season, the channel broadcasts Kansas Jayhawks and Kansas State Wildcats games in different time slots to avoid scheduling conflicts; the channel also broadcasts Kansas State Wildcats basketball and volleyball and baseball from the Wildcats and Kansas Jayhawks.

The channel also carries select events televised by Bally Sports Midwest including games from the St. Louis Blues (NHL); basketball, volleyball, baseball and wrestling events from the Missouri Tigers, with the university's college football games televised on an alternate feed. The Blues games are only shown within the Kansas City metropolitan area, as a separate feed exists for the rest of the state of Kansas.

Other sports programming on the network includes Big 12 Conference regular season women's basketball and baseball games, and championship matches from both conference-sanctioned sports; regular season and championship basketball games from the Missouri Valley Conference; college coaches' shows; football and basketball championships from the Missouri State High School Activities Association; and NBA games from the Oklahoma City Thunder televised by Bally Sports Oklahoma. In addition select Minnesota Timberwolves (produced by Bally Sports North) are shown outside of the Kansas City metropolitan area.

Notable on-air staff

Kansas City Royals
 Ryan Lefebvre – play-by-play commentary
 Jake Eisenberg – fill in play-by-play commentary
 Rex Hudler – analyst
 Jeff Montgomery – analyst
 Joel Goldberg – in game reporter

Sporting Kansas City
 Nate Bukaty - play-by-play commentary
 Jacob Peterson - color analyst
 Carter Augustine - sideline reporter

References

External links

Bally Sports
Fox Sports Networks
Sporting Kansas City
Television channels and stations established in 2008
Companies that filed for Chapter 11 bankruptcy in 2023
2008 establishments in Missouri